New York's 146th State Assembly district is one of the 150 districts in the New York State Assembly. It has been represented by Karen McMahon since 2019.

Geography

2020s
District 146 contains the town of Amherst in Erie County.

2010s
District 146 contained the village of Williamsville and the town of Amherst in Erie County and the town of Pendleton in Niagara County.

Recent election results

2022

2020

2018

2016

2014

2012

References

146
 Erie County, New York
 Niagara County, New York